Rongmuda (Mandarin: 茸木达乡) is a township in Zamthang County, Ngawa Tibetan and Qiang Autonomous Prefecture, Sichuan, China. In 2010, Rongmuda Township had a total population of 1,970: 971 males and 999 females: 527 aged under 14, 1,270 aged between 15 and 65 and 173 aged over 65.

References 
 

 

 
Township-level divisions of Sichuan
Ngawa Tibetan  and Qiang Autonomous Prefecture